"Get Off of My Cloud" is a song by the English rock band the Rolling Stones. It was written by Mick Jagger and Keith Richards for a single to follow the successful "(I Can't Get No) Satisfaction". Recorded in Hollywood, California, in early September 1965, the song was released in September in the United States and October in the United Kingdom.
It topped the charts in the US, UK, Canada, and Germany and reached number two in several other countries.

Composition

The Stones have said that the song is a reaction to their suddenly greatly enhanced popularity and deals with their aversion to people's expectations of them after the success of "Satisfaction". Richards commented: "'Get Off of My Cloud' was basically a response to people knocking on our door asking us for the follow-up to 'Satisfaction' ... We thought 'At last. We can sit back and maybe think about events'. Suddenly there's the knock at the door and of course what came out of that was 'Get Off of My Cloud'". In 1971 he added:

In a 1995 interview with Rolling Stone, Jagger said, "That was Keith's melody and my lyrics... It's a stop-bugging-me, post-teenage-alienation song. The grown-up world was a very ordered society in the early '60s, and I was coming out of it. America was even more ordered than anywhere else. I found it was a very restrictive society in thought and behavior and dress."

The song opens with a drum intro by Charlie Watts and twin guitars by Brian Jones and Richards.  Ultimate Classic Rock critic Michael Gallucci called this Watts' best drumming performance, saying that it has "one of the most unconventional drum structures ever employed in a Top 40 hit" in which Watts basically :plays the same 4/4-beat-fill-4/4-beat-fill pattern throughout the song" and does not break the beat even once.

Personnel

According to authors Philippe Margotin and Jean-Michel Guesdon, except where noted:

The Rolling Stones
 Mick Jagger vocals
 Keith Richards rhythm guitar, backing vocals
 Brian Jones twelve-string electric guitar, lead guitar, acoustic guitar
 Bill Wyman bass, backing vocals
 Charlie Watts drums

Additional musicians
 Ian Stewart piano
 Unidentified musician(s) hand claps

Release
The 1965 single release was a major success for the Rolling Stones. In the US, the single reached number one on the Billboard Hot 100 on 6 November 1965, and remained there for two weeks. The song was included on the band's next American album, December's Children (And Everybody's), released in December 1965. The song stayed at number one in the UK Singles Chart for three weeks in November that year.  Billboard described the song as a "wild, far out beat number which will have no trouble topping their 'Satisfaction' smash."  Cash Box described it as a "rollicking, fast-moving blues-soaked thumper with an infectious danceable beat" that should be another success after "Satisfaction."

Appearances on later Stones releases include:

Got Live If You Want It! (live album, 1966)
Big Hits (High Tide and Green Grass) (compilation album, 1966)
Hot Rocks 1964–1971 (compilation album, 1971)
30 Greatest Hits (compilation album, 1977)
Singles Collection: The London Years (compilation album, 1989)
Forty Licks (compilation album, 2002)
The Biggest Bang (live DVD-set, 2007)
GRRR! (compilation album, 2012)

Chart history

Weekly charts

Year-end charts

References

Sources

External links
Complete Official Lyrics
 

1965 songs
1965 singles
The Rolling Stones songs
Billboard Hot 100 number-one singles
Cashbox number-one singles
Number-one singles in Germany
Number-one singles in South Africa
UK Singles Chart number-one singles
Decca Records singles
London Records singles
Songs written by Jagger–Richards
RPM Top Singles number-one singles
Song recordings produced by Andrew Loog Oldham